The Luxembourg women's national under-20 basketball team is a national basketball team of Luxembourg, administered by the Luxembourg Basketball Federation. It represents the country in women's international under-20 basketball competitions. In 2000 and 2004, the team participated at the FIBA Europe Under-20 Championship for Women qualifications.

Team results

See also
Luxembourg women's national basketball team
Luxembourg women's national under-18 basketball team
Luxembourg men's national under-20 basketball team

References

External links
Archived records of Luxembourg team participations

Basketball in Luxembourg
Basketball
Women's national under-20 basketball teams